The Lewiston & Youngstown Frontier Electric Railway connected the villages of Lewiston and Youngstown in Niagara County, New York.

Company 
The company was set-up by a number of local capitalists in the summer of 1895. After a number of surveys the railroad was finally located through private property between these villages, about one-quarter of a mile easterly from the River Road, thus avoiding the destruction of property along the banks of the lower Niagara River, or occupying the highway.

Route 
The contract for the construction of the roadbed, ballasting, overhead work and fencing was let April 12, 1896, to Craige & Tench, Buffalo, New York, for the sum of $63,500. The railroad started from the New York Central depot at Lewiston and ran up Center street to 5th street. Then it ran northerly through 5th street to the village limits, then through private lands to 3rd street, Youngstown, then through Church street to Main street and to the United States Military Reservation, at the mouth of the Niagara River. There was also a branch in Lewiston from 5th street through Onondaga street to the New York Central freight station and a branch in Youngstown to the docks.

The country through which this road ran is extremely level and is in the heart of the Niagara fruit district, being largely devoted to the culture of apples, peaches and grapes.

Track 
The Johnson Company furnished the rails and track fastenings and all the rails except the 87-lb/yard (43.5 kg/m) girders which were rolled by the Pennsylvania Steel Company. The ties were of cedar,  x , spaced  between centers. The line was ballasted with 

Electrification 
R. W. Oliver furnished the overhead work at a cost of $9,750. In the villages span work was used and in the country side pole bracket work. All poles and fence posts were painted olive green. 

It was generated by one of the 1.000-h.p. generators situated in the new power house at the foot of the cliff at a voltage of 550 Volts. This was raised to 750 volts by being passed through a booster and was conveyed to Lewiston over a 500,000 circular mil stranded copper wire triple covered. This wire was strung on the poles of the Niagara Gorge Railroad and thus brought to Lewiston, where it was connected with the trolley and feed wire.

Rolling stock 
The equipment consisted of four, eight bench open motor cars and two closed combination baggage and passenger cars seating 16 people, made by the J. G. Brill Company, Philadelphia. All these cars are equipped with Brill eureka maximum traction trucks, with  diameter wheels. Each truck was equipped with one G.E. 1,000 motor, thus giving each car  horizontal tractive pull. The 
total cost of roadway, equipment, transmission line, land 
damages, etc., amounted to very nearly $100,000.

Operation 
After a number of delays, owing to the non-arrival of material, etc., the road was informally opened the latter part of August, 1896. The company contemplated a freight as well as a passenger service, and was handling about 10 cars of freight per day in 1897, beside package freight. A steady passenger traffic was maintained between the points mentioned, which increased during the summer. 

When the Niagara Gorge Railroad was taken out of use in 1935, the Lewiston & Youngstown Frontier Electric Railway remained in service as a diesel freight line.

Personnel 
The officers of the company were:
 L. D. Rumsey, president
 H. C. Howard, vice-president and treasurer
 F. R. March, attorney
 Karl Evans, general passenger and freight agent
 R. B. Goodman, superintendent, all of Buffalo, New York. 

The engineering work was led by Paul Voorhes of Buffalo. He constructed other rails, among them Buffalo & Williamsville Electric Railway and the Buffalo, Gardenville & Ebenezer Railway.

References 

Defunct railroads
Transportation in Niagara County, New York
Niagara Falls National Heritage Area
Defunct New York (state) railroads
Interurban railways in New York (state)
Transportation in Niagara Falls, New York